Zinyat Valiyeva (born 6 May 1974, Keçili, Shamkir Rayon) is an Azerbaijani paralympic archer in ARW2 (Wheelchair W2) classification. On 2011 Para-Archery World Ranking Event in Nymburk she won a bronze medal. Valiyeva presented Azerbaijan at 2012 Summer Paralympics.

In January 2008 she was on 24 place in World Ranking List, in September 2011 she was on 17 place.

Achievements

Sources

External links
 "Kamançı qızın uğur hekayəti" by Ülviyyə Əsədzadə. FreeRadio

Photos 
 Nymburk-16.8.2011 (behind)
 Nymburk-16.8.2011 (behind)
 Nymburk-16.8.2011 (behind)
 Nymburk-17.8.2011. Awarding ceremony (2nd from the left)

1974 births
Living people
People from Shamkir
Paralympic archers of Azerbaijan
Archers at the 2012 Summer Paralympics
Azerbaijani female archers